Baljevac, also known as Baljevac na Ibru, is a town located in the municipality of Raška, southwestern Serbia. It is situated on the banks of the Ibar River. The population of the town is 1,482 people (2011 census).

References

Populated places in Raška District